The 2012 Federated Auto Parts 400 was a NASCAR Sprint Cup Series stock car race held on September 8, 2012 at Richmond International Raceway in Richmond, Virginia. Contested over 400 laps, it was the twenty-sixth and final race leading into the Chase for the Sprint Cup in the 2012 Sprint Cup Series season.

Clint Bowyer of Michael Waltrip Racing won the race, his second of the season. Jeff Gordon finished second to clinch the second wild card spot in the Chase, and Mark Martin finished third.

Report

Background

Richmond International Raceway is one of five short tracks to hold NASCAR races; the others are Bristol Motor Speedway, Dover International Speedway, Martinsville Speedway, and Phoenix International Raceway. The track's turns are banked at fourteen degrees. The front stretch, the location of the finish line, is banked at eight degrees while the back stretch has two degrees of banking. The racetrack has seats for 94,063 spectators.

Practice and qualifying

Race

Start

First half
The race was set to start at 7:43 p.m. EDT but the start was delayed 90 minutes, and the cars were running under caution speed, Jeff Gordon was leading when the race restarted on lap 8, The second caution came out on lap 48, this was a planned competition caution, The race restarted on lap 52, and the third caution then came out on lap 53 for a one-car spin in the back straightaway (David Ragan), the race restarted on lap 57, and a couple of laps later, the fourth caution came out for rain on lap 139, by lap 153, the cars were brought down pit road the race was red flagged as rain returned again. After a delay of fifty-one minutes and 45 seconds, the cars started rolling again, and the race restarted on lap 156.

Second half
The fifth caution came out on lap 235 when Clint Bowyer spun out in the back straightaway, the race restarted on lap 239, The race was under longer green flag runs until the end, Clint Bowyer stretched his fuel mileage and despite a late charge from Jeff Gordon, the lead was too big to overcome for Gordon, and Bowyer would score his second win in Richmond, as well as the second win in the season. Gordon rallied back from going one lap down to finish 2nd, and knocked Kyle Busch out of the Chase by 3 points (Kyle finished 16th). Mark Martin clinched third.

Results

Qualifying

References

NASCAR races at Richmond Raceway
Federated Auto Parts 400
Federated Auto Parts 400
Federated Auto Parts 400